The year 1916 was marked, in science fiction, by the following events.

Births and deaths

Births 
 August 28 : Jack Vance, American writer (died 2013)

Deaths

Events

Awards 
The main science-fiction Awards known at the present time did not exist at this time.

Literary releases

Novels

Stories collections

Short stories

Comics

Audiovisual outputs

Movies 
 The End of the World, by August Blom.
 20,000 Leagues Under the Sea, by Stuart Paton.
 Homunculus, series of six German movies, by Otto Rippert.

See also 
 1916 in science
 1915 in science fiction
 1917 in science fiction

References

science-fiction
Science fiction by year